Jérémy Abadie (born 17 October 1988) is a French professional footballer who plays for as a midfielder for AS La Châtaigneraie.

Career
Abadie was born in Le Blanc-Mesnil, Seine-Saint-Denis. He has played in the Ligue 2 for RC Strasbourg.

He moved to FC Challans from La Roche VF in 2017.

References

External links
 

1988 births
Living people
People from Le Blanc-Mesnil
Footballers from Seine-Saint-Denis
Association football midfielders
French footballers
Ligue 2 players
Championnat National players
Championnat National 2 players
Championnat National 3 players
US Torcy players
INF Clairefontaine players
RC Strasbourg Alsace players
FC Mulhouse players
US Saint-Malo players
Red Star F.C. players
Les Herbiers VF players
La Roche VF players